The 1936 Copa del Presidente de la República Final decided the winner of the 1936 Copa del Presidente de la República, the 36th staging of Spain's premier football cup, now known as the Copa del Rey. The final was the last one before the tournament was cancelled due to the Spanish Civil War until 1939, and therefore the last one under the "Copa del Predidente de la República" name.

In the match, held on 21 June at the Mestalla in Valencia, Real Madrid (then known as Madrid FC for political reasons) defeated FC Barcelona 2-1 in the first El Clásico final. It was Real Madrid's 7th title in their 15th final, while Barcelona appeared for the 16th time and were denied their 13th title.

The match is remembered for the "impossible save" by Madrid goalkeeper Ricardo Zamora, which denied Barcelona's Josep Escolà from scoring a last-minute equaliser. This is the most remembered save in the history of Spanish football.

Road to the final

Match details

See also
El Clásico

References

External links
MundoDeportivo.com 
Marca.com 
AS.com 

Copa del Rey Finals
Copa Del Rey Final 1936
Copa Del Rey Final 1936
1935–36 in Spanish football
Copa